Kabilarmalai was former state assembly constituency in Namakkal district in Tamil Nadu.

Members of Legislative Assembly

Tamil Nadu

Election results

2006

2001

1996

1991

1989

1984

1980

1977

1971

1967

1962

References

External links
 

Former assembly constituencies of Tamil Nadu
Namakkal district